Habash-e Olya (also Romanized as Ḩabash-e ‘Olyā; also known as Ḩabashī Bālā, Ḩabashī-ye Bālā, and Ḩabashī-ye ‘Olyā) is a village in Qatur Rural District, Qatur District, Khoy County, West Azerbaijan Province, Iran. At the 2006 census, its population was 1,269, in 221 families.

References 

Populated places in Khoy County